WRSM may refer to:

 WRSM (FM), a radio station (89.1 FM) licensed to serve Rising Sun, Maryland, United States
 WKDG, a defunct radio station (1540 AM) formerly licensed to serve Sumiton, Alabama, United States, which held the call sign WRSM until 2009
 WBGU (FM), which initially operated under the callsign WRSM (600 AM).